is a multimedia franchise created by Cygames. A mobile game for iOS and Android was scheduled to debut in late 2018 and then delayed to February 2021. A 13-episode anime television series adaptation by P.A. Works aired from April to June 2018, followed by a second season by Studio Kai which aired from January to March 2021. A third season is set to premiere in 2023. An anime television series adaptation of the spin-off manga Umayon aired from July to September 2020. A short web anime titled Umayuru premiered in October 2022. A second web anime titled Uma Musume Pretty Derby: Road to the Top is set to premiere in April 2023.

Plot
In a world very much like our own, great race horses of the past have a chance to be reborn as "horse girls"—girls with the ears and tails of horses as well as their speed and endurance. The best of these horse girls go to train at Tokyo's Tracen Academy, hopefully moving on to fame and fortune as both racers and idols.

The first season features Special Week, a high school horse girl from the countryside, who has just transferred to Tracen. She's determined to fulfill her promise to her mother to become the best horse girl in Japan. On her way to school, she visits the race track and instantly falls in love with Silence Suzuka's style, becoming determined to race on the same team as her.

The second season features Tokai Teio as the main character, and draws focus to other side characters such as Mejiro Mcqueen, Rice Shower, and Mihono Bourbon. Like the horse she is based upon, she suffers multiple injuries and struggles to remain one of the best racers.

Characters
Most of the horse girls are named after famous legendary Japanese racehorses and are inspired by their careers and personalities. Each horse girl wears a ribbon or other accessory on one ear (or wears a hat that tilts toward one ear); if it's on the girl's right ear (viewer's left) then that girl's namesake was a stallion, or if it's on the girl's left ear (viewer's right) then her namesake was a mare.

Team Spica (Anime only) 
 is the main character team for the first and second seasons of the anime.

She serves as the protagonist for the anime's first season and the final chapter of Part 1 of the video game's main story.
A young horse girl raised in Hokkaido, she never met another horse girl until she joined the Academy. Her birth mother died shortly after she was born and she was raised by her human mother to be the best horse girl in Japan. She has great stamina and speed and an instinct on the track as to when to hold back and when to open up.
In the main story of the video game, she will become a member of Team Sirius after Narita Brian, aiming to be the best horse girl in Japan.

She serves as the co-protagonist for the anime's first season and the protagonist for Chapter 5 of Part 1 of the video game's main story.
An accomplished young horse girl. She is one generation older than Special Week, is Special Week's roommate and teammate. Her racing, performance, and friendship inspire Special Week. Her goal is to make people dream and she believes that is what it means to be the best horse girl. Later on in the anime she goes to America.
In the main story of the video game, she becomes a member of Team Sirius with the advice of Special Week and the trainer.

She serves as the protagonist for the anime's second season.
A talented horse girl on Special Week's team. She has a strong admiration for the Student Council President, Symboli Rudolf, and wishes to one day be as good as her. She becomes Mejiro McQueen's rival, but suffers from repeated injuries.

She serves as the co-protagonist for the anime's second season and the protagonist for Chapter 1 of Part 1 of the video game's main story.
A horse girl of the famous Mejiro family. She is one generation older than Tokai Teio. She joined Special Week's team after being implored by Gold Ship numerous times. She may initially seem cold and blunt, but she actually cares for others and is willing to help them when needed.
In the main story of the video game, she is the only remaining member of Team Sirius and will race with a new trainer.

A horse girl on Special Week's team, Spica. She is somewhat eccentric and seems to hold a deep admiration for and friendly rivalry with Mejiro McQueen. Initially, she was the only team member.
In the main story of the video game, she became a member of Team Sirius after Mejiro McQueen, but she isn't physically fit yet and rarely races.

She is a young horse girl who is a junior of Special Week, is one of the first three to join the team with Daiwa Scarlet.

She is also a young horse girl who is a junior of Special Week and is a Vodka rival.

Team Rigil (Anime only) 
 is the rival character team for the first and second seasons of the anime.

The student council president of the academy. One of the Triple Crown Horse Girls.
In the manga "Cinderella Gray", she has Oguri Cap incorporated into the Central Academy.

The student council vice president of the academy. She is a rival of the same generation as Silence Suzuka.
Narita Brian

She is Rittō dormitory director. She calls young horse girl "Pony-chan". She is of the same generation as Mayano Top Gun.

She is Miho dormitory director. She is particular about face-off. She is a rival of the same generation as Narita Brian.

A horse girl from USA who is friends with Special Week. She gets injured and is unable to race for a short time, but aspires to regain her former speed and surpass Silence Suzuka.

A horse girl from USA who received training abroad and aspires to compete in foreign races. She sees Special Week as her rival, but remains on friendly terms with her even when competing together.

She is the strongest horse girl called "Supercar" or "Monster".

She is the generation of Silence Suzuka from USA and has the best sprint performance.
T.M. Opera O

Team Canopus (Anime only) 
 is the rival character team for the second season of the anime.

She is a generation of Tokai Teio, and although she does not perform well, she is working very hard. She is also a friend of Silence Suzuka in the anime's first season.

She is a generation of Tokai Teio, and although she does not perform well because she runs at full power at any distance, she unilaterally sees Tokai Teio as a rival.

She is a generation as Mejiro McQueen and is also in the same room in the dormitory. She is careful not to get injured.

She is a generation as Rice Shower and often runs the same races. She is unlucky and often has nosebleeds.

BNW 
BNW is the main characters of OVA.

She represents the next generation of Rice Shower and is Narita Brian's elder sister. She cares about her head looking big.

She is a rival to Biwa Hayahide and Winning Ticket, but she is born small but is trying hard.

She serves as the protagonist for Chapter 3 of Part 1 of the video game's main story.
She is a rival of Biwa Hayahide and Narita Taishin and has a straightforward personality. She is also a friend of Silence Suzuka in the anime's first season.
In the main story of the video game, she will be a member of Team Sirius after Rice Shower, aiming to win the Japan Derby.

Main characters of Cinderella Gray 

She serves as the protagonist for manga "Cinderella Gray".
She is a horse girl called "Gray-Haired Monster" and has transferred from the local "Kasamatsu Tracen Academy" to the central "Japan Tracen Academy". She is a very big eater.
In the main story of the video game, she was a former member of Team Sirius and left the team when she retired.

She is a generation older than the young Oguri Cap and is the biggest rival, called the "White Lightning Bolt".

She is also a rival of the Oguri Cap generation, and is called "The Three Strongest Eternals" along with Oguri Cap and Inari One.

She is of the same generation as Tamamo Cross, is an Oguri Cap rival to replace Tamamo Cross and has also transferred from a local academy.

She is of the same generation as Tamamo Cross, is a beautiful horse girl and she is also a hairdresser and model.

She is one generation below Symbol Rudolph, is a childhood friend of Symboli Rudolf and has been racing in Europe for a long time.

She is a generation of Oguri Cap and participates in classic races where Oguri Cap cannot compete.

She has also participated in classic races where Oguri Cap cannot participate, but she is injured and feels ill.

She has also participated in classic races where Oguri Cap cannot participate, but she gets injured after Japan Derby.

She is also a rival of the Oguri Cap generation, but it didn't work out when she was young.

Team Sirius (Video game only) 
 is the main character team for Part 1 of the video game's main story.
Oguri Cap

Mejiro McQueen
She serves as the protagonist for Chapter 1 of Part 1 of the video game's main story.

Gold Ship

She serves as the protagonist for Chapter 2 of Part 1 of the video game's main story.
She is the next generation of Tokai Teio and is booed by the audience for blocking the Mihono Bourbon Triple Crown.
In the main story of the video game, she will be a member of Team Sirius after Gold Ship, competing with Mejiro McQueen.
Winning Ticket
She serves as the protagonist for Chapter 3 of Part 1 of the video game's main story.

Narita Brian
She serves as the protagonist for Chapter 4 of Part 1 of the video game's main story.

Silence Suzuka
She serves as the protagonist for Chapter 5 of Part 1 of the video game's main story.

Special Week
She serves as the protagonist for the final chapter of Part 1 of the video game's main story.

Main characters of Star Blossom 

She serves as the protagonist for manga "Star Blossom".
She is a horse girl of the same generation as Narita Bryan, but due to her physical weakness, she was unable to participate in the classic race.

She serves as the protagonist for Chapter 4 of Part 1 of the video game's main story.
The student council vice president of the academy. One of the Triple Crown Horse Girls. She is Biwa Hayahide's younger sister.
In the main story of the video game, she will be a member of Team Sirius next to Winning Ticket, aiming for the Triple Crown.

She is the next generation of Narita Brian and is in the same dormitory room as Tokai Teio. She is an avid Top Gun fan, including using aeronautical references and wearing a bomber jacket. Ahead of the release of Top Gun: Maverick, Cygames and Paramount announced a Japanese collaboration between the film and Uma Musume, which featured her appearing as a promotional pilot, including her replacing Tom Cruise's Pete "Maverick" Mitchell in an official alternate Japanese movie poster.

She is a horse girl of the same generation as Mayano Top Gun, but due to repeated injuries, she was unable to participate in the classic race.

Main characters of Road to the Top 

She serves as the protagonist for anime series "Road to the Top".
She is the class president of the T.M. Opera O generation.

She is the next generation of Special Week and is called the "End of the Century Overlord".

She is a rival of the T.M. Opera O generation and is trying to do her best for her stillborn twin sister.

Appeared from Anime Season 1 

She is a Special Week generation rival who competed in classic races. She has a loose personality.

She is a Special Week generation rival who competed in classic races. She does not perform well, but she runs with pride.

She is the generation of T.M. Opera O, is the first horse girl to talk to Special Week. She runs in a local Kochi race track.

One of the Triple Crown Horse Girls. She is one generation above Symbol Rudolph and her biggest rival.

She is a generation of Silence Suzuka and is a fortune teller in the academy.

She is the biggest rival of the T.M. Opera O generation and is an assistant to the fortune-telling of Matikanefukukitaru in the academy. She is always unconfident and frightened.

She is a polite horse girl from Germany. She is also a friend of Silence Suzuka in the anime's first season.

She is the representative of the Mejiro McQueen and Mejiro Palmer generations of the Mejiro family, and cares about her juniors, Mejiro Dober and Mejiro Bright. She is also a friend of Silence Suzuka in the anime's first season.

She is horse girl of the Silence Suzuka generation and respects Mejiro Ryan, a senior of the Mejiro family. She is not good at men.

Appeared from OVA 

She is a rival of Rice Shower generation and has been instructed by her master to be so rigorous that she is called a "cyborg".

She is a horse girl who likes coffee. She has a ghost "friend" that only she can see.

She is a generation of Manhattan Cafe and is a mad scientist who focuses on research. She cares about Daiwa Scarlet.

She is a generation of Fine Motion and is a smart horse girl who attaches great importance to data analysis.

She is a generation above Mejiro McQueen, a horse girl with a sun visor and feeding her sisters.

She is a rice shower generation. She is from Iwate and has a dialect. She longs for her urban Gold City.

She is a BNW generation and a rival of Hishi Akebono. She has a small body and longs for a tokusatsu hero.

She is the Mayano Top Gun generation. She is very big and likes sumo. She is good at cooking.

She is a royal horse girl from Ireland. She likes ramen.

She is a horse girl who travels around the countryside as an idol.

She is the class president of the Rice Shower generation and is the strongest sprinter.

Appeared from Anime Season 2 

She is a horse girl who is a fan of Tokai Teio. She is an elementary school student in the anime, and she enrolls in Tracen Academy in the final episode.

She is a horse girl who is a fan of Mejiro McQueen. Like Kitasan Black, she is an elementary school student in anime, and she enrolls in Tracen Academy in the final episode.

She is a member of the Mejiro family and is of the same generation as Mejiro McQueen and Mejiro Ryan. She is good at running away.

She is a close friend of Mejiro Palmer and is also good at running away. She is also a gyaru.

She is a quiet horse girl who likes novels and wears glasses.

She is a selfish horse girl who aims to be a witch.

Appeared from Anime Umayuru 

She is a taciturn and big horse girl of the same generation as Tanino Gimlet.

She is the rival of Symbolic Chris. Vodka admires her.

She is a horse girl of the same generation as Special Week, but her debut was delayed due to her weak body. She respects Symbol Rudolph.

Other horse girls

NPC horse girls 

She is a NPC horse girl.
 (Video game only)

She is a NPC horse girl who belongs to Team First.
 (Video game only)

She is a NPC horse girl who belongs to Team First.
 (Video game only)

She is a retired NPC horse girl and a young event producer.

Persons involved in Tracen Academy 

She is the secretary of the president of Tracen Academy.

She is the president of Tracen Academy.
 (Anime only)

He is a trainer for Team Spica.
 (Anime only)

She is a trainer for Team Rigil.
 (Anime only)

He is a trainer for Team Canopus.
 (Anime only)

He is a trainer for Mihono Bourbon.
 (Video game only)
In the main story of the video game, he is a sub-trainer for Team Sirius and will be the new trainer after Oguri Cap retires.
 (Video game only)

She is a trainer for Happy Meek.
 (Video game only)

She is a trainer for Team First.

Other NPCs 

She is a race narrator.

She is a race commentator.

He is a race commentator for season 1 episode 5. He is also the promoter of the game.

She is a magazine reporter.

She is a suspicious doctor.

Media

Video game
The game was announced in 2016. An animated trailer by P.A. Works debuted at that year's AnimeJapan event. It was set to be released in late 2018, but was delayed until its release on February 24, 2021. The PC version was released on March 10, 2021.

Manga
A manga series titled , written by Katsumi Nakayama and illustrated by Huan Yu (ZECO), and titled , written and illustrated by Katsumi Nakayama, is serialized on Cygames' Cycomics website from May 8, 2016, to September 11, 2016. 10 episodes in total. This is a comedic story based on the true story of Haru Urara, with Haru Urara as the main character. The production was supported by Martha Farm, where the real Haru Urara lives the rest of her life, and the Kochi Prefecture Horse Racing Association.

A manga series titled {{nihongo|Starting Gate!: Uma Musume Pretty Derby''''|STARTING GATE! -ウマ娘 プリティーダービー-|Stātingu Geito!: Uma Musume Pretty Derby}}, written by Cygames and illustrated by S. Kosugi, began serialization on Cygames' Cycomics website on March 25, 2017. The manga has been compiled into six tankōbon volumes as of March 18, 2022.

A four-panel manga series titled , written and illustrated by Jet Kuma, began serialization on Cygames' Cycomics website in March 2018.

Another manga, titled , produced by Junnosuke Itō, written by Masafumi Sugiura and illustrated by Taiyō Kuzumi, began in Shueisha's Weekly Young Jump on June 11, 2020. The first collected tankōbon volume was released on January 19, 2021. As of August 2022, eight volumes have been released.

Another manga, titled , written by Saki Monju and illustrated by Shin Hosaka, will begin serialization in Shueisha's Shōnen Jump+, Young Jump! app and Tonari no Young Jump website in Spring 2023.

Another manga, titled Uma Musume Pretty Derby Uma Musumeshi, will begin serialization on Cygames' Cycomics website on March 2, 2023.

Anime
A 13-episode anime television series adaptation by P.A. Works aired from April 2 to June 18, 2018, on Tokyo MX, with the first two episodes being broadcast back-to-back. Crunchyroll streamed the series. The anime is directed by Kei Oikawa at P.A. Works with scripts written by Masafumi Sugiura and Akihiro Ishihara. Utamaro Movement composed the music at Lantis. The series' opening theme is "Make Debut" and the ending theme is "Grow Up Shine!"; both are sung by Azumi Waki, Marika Kouno, Machico, Ayaka Ōhashi, Chisa Kimura, Hitomi Ueda, and Saori Ōnishi. A second season, with a returning cast and a new studio in Studio Kai, aired from January 5 to March 30, 2021. On February 22, 2022, a new animation "1st Anniversary Special Animation" was released on YouTube to commemorate the first anniversary of the game. This work is a continuation of TV anime season 2. A third season by Studio Kai was announced on November 6, 2022. Shingo Nagai and Tetsuya Kobari are supervising the scripts, while the rest of the main staff are returning from previous seasons. The season is set to premiere in 2023.

A web animation YouTube channel titled  was launched on March 25, 2018. The channel features the character Gold Ship.

An anime television series based on the four-panel manga spinoff  aired from July 7 to September 22, 2020. The series is directed by Seiya Miyajima at DMM.futureworks and W-Toon Studio. On December 8, 2021, a Blu-ray containing the main story, 12 episodes of the new OVA, and a manga tankōbon was released. A new short anime series titled  was announced on May 5, 2022. It is animated by Scooter Films with Miyajima returning to direct and design the characters, with Seiichirō Mochizuki and Yumi Suzumori writing the screenplay. It premiered on YouTube on October 16, 2022.

A new anime series titled  was announced on May 4, 2022. It is animated by CygamesPictures and directed by Chengzhi Liao, with Tetsuya Kobari supervising the scripts and serving as scenario director, and Jun Yamazaki designing the characters and serving as chief animation director. The series will premiere on YouTube on April 16, 2023.

Uma Musume Pretty Derby
Season 1

Season 2

Umayon

Umayuru

Reception
This makes it the world's ninth highest-grossing mobile game of 2021.

The manga spin-off, Uma Musume Cinderella Grey'', was nominated in the seventh Next Manga Awards in the Best Print Manga category and placed 2nd of 50 nominees.

The Blu-ray release of the second season of the anime became the highest selling home video release of a television anime series in Japan.

Notes

References

External links
 
 
 

2018 anime television series debuts
2020 anime television series debuts
2022 anime ONAs
2023 anime ONAs
2023 manga
Android (operating system) games
Anime television series based on video games
Crunchyroll anime
Cygames franchises
Gacha games
Horse racing in anime and manga
Horse racing mass media
Horse-related video games
IOS games
Japanese webcomics
Manga based on video games
Medialink
Moe anthropomorphism
P.A.Works
Seinen manga
Shueisha manga
Studio Kai
Toho Animation
Upcoming anime television series
Video games scored by Yasunori Nishiki
Windows games
Yonkoma